Stamets is a surname. Notable people with the surname include:

 Andy Stamets (born 1973), American guitarist
 Eric Stamets (born 1991), American baseball player
 Paul Stamets (born 1955), American mycologist and entrepreneur